Kagurazaka Ishikawa is a Michelin 3-star kaiseki restaurant in Shinjuku, Tokyo, Japan. It is owned and operated by chef Hideki Ishikawa. It is a personal favorite of chef David Kinch.

The restaurant has four private rooms and can seat seven at the counter.

See also
 List of Japanese restaurants
 List of Michelin three starred restaurants

References

External links
 

Tourist attractions in Tokyo
Restaurants in Tokyo
Michelin Guide starred restaurants in Japan